Is That All There Is? is a 1969 studio album by Peggy Lee, featuring arrangements by Randy Newman. The eponymous title track won Lee the Grammy Award for Best Contemporary Vocal Performance, Female at the 12th Grammy Awards.

Reception

The Allmusic review by Alex Henderson awarded the album four and a half stars and commented thatEverything on this LP is a gem ... The LP's centerpiece, however, is Newman's hit arrangement of Leiber & Stoller's title song, which was covered by P.J. Harvey in the 1990s. Influenced by German cabaret, this half-spoken, half-sung treasure is as hauntingly soulful as it is maudlin. The song's outlook is far from optimistic; essentially, it's saying that we might as well grab our moments of pleasure and enjoyment where we can find them because ultimately, life is nothing more than a meaningless series of disappointments. But there's nothing disappointing about Is That All There Is?, an LP that is most certainly among Lee's finest accomplishments.

Track listing
 "Is That All There Is?" (Jerry Leiber, Mike Stoller) - 4:20
 "Love Story" (Randy Newman) - 3:27
 "Me and My Shadow" (Al Jolson, Billy Rose, Dave Dreyer) - 3:04
 "My Old Flame" (Sam Coslow, Arthur Johnston) - 4:24
 "I'm a Woman" (Jerry Leiber, Mike Stoller) - 2:09
 "Brother Love's Travelling Salvation Show" (Neil Diamond) - 3:00
 "Something" (George Harrison) - 3:14
 "Whistle for Happiness" (Jerry Leiber, Mike Stoller) - 3:25
 "Johnny (Linda)" (Randy Newman) - 2:47
 "Don't Smoke in Bed" (Willard Robison) - 3:31

Personnel
 Peggy Lee - vocals
 Randy Newman - arranger, conductor on "Is That All There Is?"
Mundell Lowe - arranger, conductor
Bobby Bryant - arranger, conductor
Benny Carter - arranger, conductor
Mike Melvoin - arranger, conductor
William George - illustration

References

Capitol Records albums
Peggy Lee albums
1969 albums
Albums arranged by Randy Newman
albums arranged by Mike Melvoin
albums arranged by Bobby Bryant (musician)
albums arranged by Benny Carter
Albums conducted by Randy Newman
albums conducted by Bobby Bryant (musician)
Albums produced by Jerry Leiber
Albums produced by Mike Stoller
Albums produced by Dave Cavanaugh
Albums recorded at Capitol Studios